Neumayer Cliffs is a series of abrupt rock cliffs forming the northeast end of Kirwan Escarpment in Queen Maud Land. Discovered by the German Antarctic Expedition under Alfred Ritscher, 1938–39, and named for German geophysicist Georg von Neumayer. Surveyed by the Norwegian-British-Swedish Antarctic Expedition (NBSAE), 1949–52.

See also
Årmålsryggen

Cliffs of Queen Maud Land
Princess Martha Coast